Trewetha is a hamlet in the parish of St Endellion, Cornwall, England, United Kingdom. There was a mine at Trewetha known as Wheal Boys.

References

Hamlets in Cornwall